Live with Friends may refer to:

 Live with Friends (album), an album by Elkie Brooks
 "Live with Friends" (song), a song recorded by Russell Morris